Locomotives of New Zealand is a complete list of all locomotive classes that operate or have operated in New Zealand's railway network. It does not include locomotives used on bush tramways.

All New Zealand's main-line locomotives run on a narrow gauge of 3 ft 6 in (1,067 mm).

Early locomotives 
The first locomotive in New Zealand was built by Slaughter & Co in Bristol, arrived at Ferrymead in May 1863 to work on Canterbury Provincial Railways' 5 ft 3 in gauge. It was withdrawn in 1876. The Ferrymead to Christchurch railway line was not completed until 1 December 1863, so the steam locomotive Lady Barkly, in use on Invercargill's jetty in August 1863 during construction of the Bluff branch, may have been the first locomotive in steam.

The first steam engines built in New Zealand were produced in 1872. Fraser and Tinne built an 0-4-0 in Auckland in 1872, but it was based on a Hornsby traction engine. Similarly, a steam crane was converted during construction of the Port Chalmers railway, though it could only haul about 10 tons. The first locomotive entirely built in the country was a  engine for the Foxton Tramway contractor, Ashworth Crawshaw, by R. S. Sparrow & Co in Dunedin, also in 1872. It was named Palmerston. Horses had replaced Palmerston by 1874, but, in 1875, after iron had replaced wooden rails, the same branch had an A class steam locomotive built in Wellington by E.W. Mills' Lion Foundry.

Classification details
Steam locomotives were originally categorised with just a single letter, such as the "F class". When a new class was built as an enhancement of an old class, the old class's letter was re-used, followed by a superscript upper-case letter.  For example, the 1906 A class was followed by the AA and AB classes.

Diesel-electric and electric locomotive classifications originally consisted of an upper-case D or E respectively followed by a second and sometimes a third (sub-class) letter. The second and third letters are sometimes represented as smaller-sized upper case (for example, as seen on many locomotive cab-side number plates).

New classes were not always given the classification that alphabetically followed that of the previous class that had most recently been acquired.  For example, the DJ class was followed by the DX class followed by the DF class. If an entire class had been withdrawn from service and the classification no longer in use, it was sometimes re-used; for example, two A classes exist, one from 1873 and one from 1906.

Traffic Monitoring System
Following the introduction of the computer-based Traffic Monitoring System (TMS) and consequent renumbering, classes were identified by the two upper-case letters with the first letter remaining D or E respectively and sub-classes being indicated by a third upper-case letter, such as DAA (DA modified for hump shunting), DAR (DA with rebuilt superstructure), DFT (DF with turbo-conversion), DXR (rebuilt DX) and so on. Most diesel shunting locomotives have a three-letter classification with DS as the first two letters, following on from the original diesel-hydraulic shunting class that was known simply as the DS class.

For electric locomotives the second letter generally referred to where the locomotive was based, such as EC in Christchurch, EO in Otira and EW in Wellington. The EM class in Wellington stands for Electric Motor and the ET stands for Electric Trailer. The DM class units were an exception to this.

Most railcars were classified RM (Rail Motor), and individual classes were known by alternate names such as the Vulcan railcars of the South Island and the Wairarapa railcars that ran over the Rimutaka Incline.

List of locomotive classes

Mainline diesel locomotives

Diesel shunting locomotives

Electric locomotives

Battery electric locomotives

Electric multiple units
Wellington electric multiple units operate on 1500 V DC overhead. Auckland's electric multiple units run on 25 kV AC overhead.

Railcars
Livery:  The first railcars were painted "carnation red" with a white or yellow stripe. The Silver Fern railcars appeared in stainless steel.

All railcars, unless otherwise stated, are designated RM class. Here, they are classified under their common names.

Experimental railcars included the following:

Diesel multiple units

Steam locomotives
Livery: New Zealand steam locomotives after the late 1920s were mainly completely black with red buffer beams at each end. Earlier steam locomotives were more varied in colour with polished brasswork and a contrasting lining on the cab sides and side tanks, for example the green of the F class Peveril.

Steam locomotive notes:
 Two other types of locomotives built in the 1870s were included in the A class.  All three had a wheel arrangement of 0-4-0T, but were technically and aesthetically quite different.  The other A types are often known as the Shanks A and the Mills A, after their respective builders.
 A completely different type of locomotive was nominally classified as being the solitary member of the S class in 1877 (the main S class was not introduced until 1880), but it was typically known as Robina.

Industrial locomotives 
A number of industrial locomotives were used by various operators connecting to the national rail network:

0-6-0 shunting locomotives 
Similar to the NZR DS class:
 Drewry 2248/1947 was built for the Ohai Railway Board as their NO 1. The railway was operated by the State Mines, and in 1968, Drewry 2248 was dispatched with its sister, NO 2, to the State Mines railway between Stirling and Kaitangata in Otago. In 1974, both locomotives moved to Rotowaro in the North Island, where they both finished working. In 1986, the locomotive was withdrawn and sold to the Bush Tramway Club at Pukemiro Junction on the former Glen Afton Branch. On 21 October 2014, Drewry 2248 arrived at the Rimutaka Incline Railway Heritage Trusts Maymorn site after being purchased for restoration. Currently, Drewry 2248 is wearing a dark green livery in place of its original red.
 Drewry 2585/1957 shares a similar operating history to Drewry 2248. Built for the ORB as their NO 2, it ended up at Rotowaro in 1986, and was purchased by the Bush Tramway Club. However, in 2005 it was purchased by the Wallis family to start the 'Waikato Railway Heritage Trust', and moved to nearby Ngauruwahia. In April 2008 it moved again to Ngongotahā, and is now owned by the Rotorua-Ngongotaha Railway Trust. It is currently being overhauled, and is painted in State Mines yellow instead of its original red.
 Whakatane Board Mills 103 (maker's 2258/1947) was built for use over the WBM Matahina Tramway, bringing logs back from the Matahina area over the Tramway to the mill via the NZR Taneatua Branch. It was later joined by Whakatane Board Mills 104 (maker's 2489/1951); together, the two diesels displaced ex-NZR 0-6-2T tank locomotives FA 41 and FA 250. In later years, the two locomotives were limited to the short length of line between the mill and the NZR connection at Awakeri and were repainted from the original black with yellow trim into a white with orange band scheme.

In 1999, Tranz Rail purchased the line between Awakeri and the mill and took over shunting operations with DBR and DSC class diesel locomotives. The two Drewrys were then onsold to Forest Loaders, a subcontractor working for Tranz Rail in the Portland area, loading log wagons at Portland. Both locomotives were renumbered by Forest Loaders as FL 106 and FL 107 respectively. Both are now preserved by the Bay of Islands Vintage Railway.

Similar to the NZR DSA class:
 W. G. Bagnall - builder's number 3079, introduced  and withdrawn , formerly used by Tasman Forestry.
 W. G. Bagnall - builder's number 3132, introduced  and withdrawn , formerly used by Portland Cement as PC 10. Preserved, Whangarei Steam and Model Railway Club.
 W. G. Bagnall - builder's number 3144, introduced  and withdrawn , formerly used by Portland Cement as PC 11. Preserved, Waitara Railway Preservation Society.

Similar to the NZR DSB class:
 Road numbers ORBs 1 and 2
 Maker's Nos 1475 and 1476

Two 0-6-0 locomotives were built by Mitsubishi Heavy Industries for industrial service for the Ohai Railway Board in 1967.

 ORB 1 was withdrawn in 1989 due to heavier trains and was replaced by DJ3303. In 1990 the New Zealand Railways Corporation took over the Ohai Railway Board's section of the Wairio Branchline. It was then stored in Wairio until being sold to the Ohai Railway Board Heritage Trust for preservation.
 ORB 2 shares a similar operating history to ORB 1, but was withdrawn in 1990. Stored in Wairio until 1992 when it was purchased by Reid McNaught for Steam Incorporated and now numbered Dsb #2. It was then sold to Russell Gibbard in the early 2000s and is still in service for shunting by Steam Inc.

 Road numbers 3079 (maker's number), WPC 10-11
 Maker's NO's 3079, 3132, 3144

A further three 0-6-0DM locomotives were built by W. G. Bagnall for industrial service in New Zealand. The first, Bagnall 3079 of 1954, was delivered to Tasman Pulp & Paper for use at their Kinleith paper plant in the Bay of Plenty. The other two, maker's nos. 3132 and 3144 of 1958, were delivered to Wilsons Portland Cement for use on their private quarry railway at Portland, just south of Whangarei. All three were exactly the same as the ten NZR locomotives which were built to the same pattern as Bagnall 3079. They were initially equipped with National M4AA6 diesel engines producing .

All three were later re-powered by A & G Price at their Thames workshops; Bagnall 3079 with a  Caterpillar D343T diesel engine and Twin Disc torque converter, while the two Portland locomotives, numbered WPC 10 (3132) and WPC 11 (3144) received  Gardner 8L3 diesel engines which were used in the DS and Drewry DSA class locomotives. Bagnall 3079 was also later fitted with extra ballast weight to increase its power output

 Bagnall 3079 was withdrawn in 1989 due to the increased shunting being beyond its capabilities. Replaced by chop-nosed DA 512, it was provisionally sold to the Bay of Islands Vintage Railway who planned to have it towed by rail to their Kawakawa depot. Unfortunately NZ Rail Ltd was concerned that the tyres needed reprofiling and wanted the locomotive to be road transported to Westfield depot in Auckland for this work to be carried before it could be moved by rail. Unable to meet the cost of transporting the locomotive and reprofiling the tyres, the BoIVR were unable to move the locomotive and it was later scrapped at Kinleith in 1990.
 WPC 10 and 11 were retired in 1990 when the Portland quarry railway closed. Both were sold to Kamo Engineering and were moved to their yard where the Gardner 8L3 engines were removed and fitted in a ship. After being stored in the yard for 15 years both were sold in 2005:
 WPC 10 was purchased by the Whangarei Steam and Model Railway Club and moved to their short line at the Whangarei Museum, Kamo in 2005. It has been cosmetically overhauled pending the arrival of a replacement Gardner 8L3 or similar low-revolution diesel engine. Its current livery is that of Wilsons Portland Cement Ltd, but with a darker shade of blue used in place of the original.
 WPC 11 moved to the Waitara Railway Preservation Society depot at Waitara Road (Brixton) in 2005. It stayed here for five years before moving to the Taranaki Flyer Trust's depot in the former Stratford goods shed. Since the trust folded this has returned to Waitara. Bagnall 3144 has not been restored and retains its original Portland Blue livery, albeit heavily faded and rust-streaked. A Gardner 8L3 engine has been acquired for this locomotive when restoration commences.

References

Citations

Bibliography

External links
New Zealand Railways Steam Locomotives
New Zealand Diesel and Electric Traction
New Zealand Locomotives

Rail transport in New Zealand
Locomotives of New Zealand